Carlos "Totoy" Ozamiz Fortich was a Filipino politician who was the longest serving governor of Bukidnon.

Career
Fortich served as governor of Bukidnon in several non-consecutive terms. He was first elected as governor in 1968 until 1978 when he was elected to the Interim Batasang Pambansa under President Ferdinand Marcos' Kilusang Bagong Lipunan (KBL). When the interim legislature ended and was replaced by the Regular Batasang Pambansa in 1984, he was succeeded by Lorenzo S. Dinlayan and Jose Ma. R. Zubiri.

He would return as Bukidnon governor in 1980. He avoided being immediately being replaced with a caretaker governor after the People Power Revolution which deposed Marcos and had Corazon Aquino installed as president by switching allegiance and burning an image of president Marcos and his wife Imelda Marcos in Malaybalay. He would be replaced as governor in December 1987 by vice governor Esmeraldo Cudal.

Fortich would become governor again of Bukidnon in 1992 and would get re-elected for two more consecutive terms. His governorship ended in 2001. He would launch a failed bid to get elected as mayor of Valencia in 2001 before deciding to retire from politics.

Death
Fortich died on February 24, 2019, at the Capitol University Medical Center (CUMC) in Cagayan de Oro. He was 83 years old. His remains were buried at the Shepherds Meadow Memorial Park in Malaybalay.

References

1930s births
2019 deaths
People from Bukidnon
Governors of Bukidnon
Members of the Batasang Pambansa